Grafty Green is a village in the Maidstone district of Kent, England, falling within the civil parish of Boughton Malherbe. It contains two public houses.  The village shop with post office closed in 2021 but was replaced with an outreach post office in the village hall. The 59 bus links Grafty Green with Maidstone on Wednesdays only.

References

Villages in Kent
Borough of Maidstone